Ingersleben is a village and a former municipality in the district of Gotha, in Thuringia, Germany. Since 1 December 2009, it is part of the municipality Nesse-Apfelstädt.

Former municipalities in Thuringia
Saxe-Coburg and Gotha